Alex Wirth (born 1 April 1953) is a Swiss retired footballer and tradesman. Wirth played for FC Basel as defender in the 1970s. He was owner a cheese specialties shop and renowned as cheese connoisseur.

Football career
Wirth played his youth football with FC Basel. He joined their first team in their 1970–71 season und head coach Helmut Benthaus. Due to his age, however, Wirth played mainly with the Inter-A-Junior team (later named U-21). In 1971 he was member of the team that won the Swiss youth championship for the first time in FCB's history with former professional Anton Schnider as coach. Later, Wirth advanced to Basel's reserve team, but was often called up to the first team and helped out in the Cup of the Alps, friendly games or domestic league when Benthaus needed a defender. Wirth played his debut for the club in the Swiss Cup home game at the St. Jakob Stadium on 29 November 1970 against Bellinzona. He was substituted in at half time for the injured Peter Ramseier as Basel won 2–0.

Wirth played his league debut for the first team in the home game on 9 December 1973 as Basel were defeated 2–3 by Young Boys. He scored one goal for the club in a test game on 2 September 1975 as Basel won 3–0 against FV Lörrach. Later that month Wirth suffered a broken ankle and fibula. It took a year for the injury to recover and before he could play again. This was then in the Swiss Cup match on 16 October 1976 against Xamax.

Wirth stayed with the club's first team until 1978 and played a total of 25 games for them scoring that one mentioned goal. Seven of these games were in the Nationalliga A, two in the Swiss Cup, seven in the Cup of the Alps and nine were friendly games.

Private life
Following his footballing time with Basel, Wirth took over the dairy business that his mother and father had started in August 1957. As the "young, hopeful player" (Wirth over Wirth) broke his ankle and his fibula at a soccer match and his father suffered a heart attack, "out of necessity I started working in his business". "Learning by doing was the order of the day", said the tradesman, who now offers 150 instead of five types of cheese: "I established the reputation of the specialties." In August 2017 Alex Wirth passed the business, named Wirth's Huus, on to his son Lucas, the third family generation.

References

Sources
 Die ersten 125 Jahre. Publisher: Josef Zindel im Friedrich Reinhardt Verlag, Basel. 
 Verein "Basler Fussballarchiv" Homepage

External links
 Wirth’s Huus online

FC Basel players
Swiss men's footballers
Association football defenders
1953 births
Living people
Footballers from Basel